The Skating Association for the Blind and Handicapped (SABAH), also known as Skating Athletes Bold at Heart, is an American non-profit educational corporation  which helps children, youth, and adults with all types of disabilities. Founded in 1977 by Elizabeth M. O'Donnell, a former professional figure skater, the Buffalo, New York based organization has taught over 9,000 people who have physical, cognitive, or emotional challenges to ice skate.

Programs 
Using locally raised funds, SABAH provides adaptive skating equipment, weekly adaptive ice skating lessons, and volunteer support to give  skating instruction to more than eight hundred people with disabilities each week. Skaters learn self-discipline and improve their strength, endurance, balance, and coordination.

References

External links

Non-profit organizations based in New York (state)
1977 establishments in New York (state)
Organizations established in 1977
Organizations based in Buffalo, New York